Jamestown Hospital is a small Provincial government funded hospital for the Maletswai Local Municipality area in Jamestown, Eastern Cape in South Africa. It used to be a (private) Provincially Aided Hospital.

The hospital departments include Emergency department, Out Patients Department, Paediatric ward, Maternity ward, Surgical Services, Medical Services, Operating Theatre & Central Sterile Services Department Services, Pharmacy, Anti-Retroviral (ARV) treatment for HIV/AIDS, Post Trauma Counseling Services, Laundry Services, Kitchen Services and Mortuary.

References 
 Eastern Cape Department of Health website - Joe Gqabi District Hospitals

Hospitals in the Eastern Cape
Joe Gqabi District Municipality